The 1973 IAAF World Cross Country Championships was held in Waregem, Belgium, at the Hippodroom Waregem on March 17, 1973.   A report on the event was given in the Glasgow Herald.

Complete results for men, junior men,  women, medallists, 
 and the results of British athletes were published.

Medallists

Race results

Senior men's race (12 km)

Note: Athletes in parentheses did not score for the team result

Junior men's race (7 km)

Note: Athletes in parentheses did not score for the team result

Senior women's race (4 km)

Note: Athletes in parentheses did not score for the team  result

Medal table (unofficial)

Note: Totals include both individual and team medals, with medals in the team competition counting as one medal.

Participation
An unofficial count yields the participation of 286 athletes from 21 countries.

 (19)
 (1)
 (9)
 (20)
 (13)
 (20)
 (20)
 (19)
 (14)
 (16)
 (14)
 (12)
 (14)
 (20)
 (8)
 (19)
 (6)
 (8)
 (6)
 (15)
 (13)

See also
 1973 IAAF World Cross Country Championships – Senior men's race
 1973 IAAF World Cross Country Championships – Junior men's race
 1973 IAAF World Cross Country Championships – Senior women's race
 1973 in athletics (track and field)

References

External links 
GBRathletics

 
1973
C
Cross
IAAF World Cross Country Championships, 1973
Cross country running in Belgium
Waregem
March 1973 sports events in Europe